Associazione Sportiva Dilettantistica Paternò Calcio is an Italian association football club located in Paternò, Sicily.

It currently plays in Serie D.

History

From Pol. Paternò to A.S.D. Paternò 2011
The first football team in Paternò is generally believed to have been established in 1908. Following World War II, several teams were founded in the city, including Polisportiva Paternò, which managed to reach Serie D in 1961/1962. Following the promotion, Paternò attempted to win the league and advance to Serie C over the following years, fielding talented players such as Gaetano Troja, the young striker who played Serie A with Palermo, and goalkeeper Marcello Trevisan, who would later play for Napoli. In the 1965/1966 season Paternò was on the verge of being promoted, as the team placed first with a one-point lead over Massiminiana of Catania, but a defeat in the season's final match left the team short as Massimiana overtook them at the top of the table and advanced to Serie C. In 1976/1977 Paternò was relegated to Promozione, but managed to quickly return to Serie D the following year. The last and final promotion for Polisportiva Paternò came in 1985/1986; the old club would be not get another opportunity to play in Serie D before its demise in 1989/1990. The next year, a new club, named Associazione Sportiva Paternò Calcio, was founded, and managed to reach Eccellenza in 1993/1994.

Paternò would return to play Serie D in 2000/2001, following a clear triumph in the 1999/2000 Eastern Sicilian Eccellenza round. The Serie D season started with a new coach, Pasquale Marino, and no particular expectations to win the league.  The surprising season ended in with a league win that brought Paternò to Serie C2 for the first time.  Paternò's first Serie C2 campaign was even more astounding, as the rossoblu ended the regular season in third place, and successively defeated S.S.C. Giugliano in the playoff semi-finals and Foggia in the finals, thereby gaining a third consecutive promotion. The ensuing 2002/2003 Serie C1 campaign was however not as successful, as Paternò ultimately was defeated by L'Aquila in the relegation playoffs; however, the team was admitted back to Serie C1 due to league vacancies.

The 2003–2004 season, with Maurizio Pellegrino as coach, ended in a lackluster relegation for the club after the playoffs to Vis Pesaro.  It would be the last for the club, which declared bankruptcy in the summer.  The new club, with the current denomination, was admitted to play Promozione, and reached Serie D in 2006. They were however relegated back to Eccellenza in 2008 after losing in the playoffs.

In the summer 2011 it was renamed A.S.D. Paternò 2011.

In summer 2012 the club has acquired the sports title of Serie D club Adrano, based in Adrano and was renamed Polisportiva Dilettantistica Comprensorio Normanno.

In summer 2013 the club was unable to enter 2013–14 Serie D, and restarted from Promozione. In the summer of 2014, the club changed its denomination to A.S.D. Paternò 1908. Now play again in Eccellenza.

Colors and badge
The colors of the team colors are red and light-blue.

Notable former managers
 Pasquale Marino

References

External links
Paternò's official website

Football clubs in Italy
Football clubs in Sicily
Paternò
Association football clubs established in 1908
Serie C clubs
1908 establishments in Italy
Serie D clubs